Fulvio Flavoni(born 25 January 1970) is an Italian football goalkeeper, who plays for FC Fossombrone in the Eccellenza. He is a keeper with much experience, but is getting near the end of his career. He hopes to remain involved in football after he retires, but really, he "doesn't what he's going to do when he becomes a 'grown up'."

Biography 
He was born in Rome, Italy. He left his family at the young age of 15 to play on the junior Campobasso team in Serie B, which he moved from the Castel di Signo to win the interregionals. The next year, he was signed with Cesena, where he stays to win the Viareggio tournament, although, according to Flavoni, "The experience arrived when I was too young to give the most of myself." After a short, successful stint with Russi, he goes back to the interregionals with Gubbio, and then to Fano in C2. At around this time, he was married to his current wife, Loredana, after having his daughter Benedetta out of wedlock. Flavoni went to several other teams, including Lanciano, which he was a part of when they were the best in Italy. He stays in the C championship for six years of his career, but when he finally leaves, he goes to Valfabbrica in Eccellenza. After the end of the two-year contract, he signs with FC Fossombrone.
Now he plays for Real Metauro in Promozione girone A.

Honours

Club

A.C. Cesena
Viareggio Tournament Champions: 1990

Lanciano
Interregional Championship Winners: 1999

See also 
The Cesena Roster

References

Notes
In the infobox, (gls) stands for goals allowed.

1970 births
Italian footballers
Living people
U.S. Russi players
A.S. Gubbio 1910 players
Association football goalkeepers